Since their first match in 2006, 65 players have represented Ireland in One Day Internationals (ODIs). A One Day International is an international cricket match between two representative teams, each having ODI status, as determined by the International Cricket Council (ICC). An ODI differs from Test matches in that the number of overs per team is limited, and that each team has only one innings. Where more than one player won his first ODI cap in the same match, those players are listed alphabetically by surname.

Ireland have played 182 ODIs, resulting in 75 victories, 93 defeats, 3 ties and 11 no results. Ireland played their maiden ODI on 13 June 2006 against England. Ireland lost by 38 runs, although the match drew interest and was played in front a full capacity crowd at the Civil Service Cricket Club in Belfast.

Jeremy Bray scored Ireland's first ODI century on 30 January 2007 in a match against Scotland. Bray later scored Ireland's maiden World Cup century when he struck 115 not out against Zimbabwe on 15 March 2007. The highest score in ODIs for Ireland is 177, scored by Paul Stirling against Canada on 7 September 2010. The record for best bowling figures in an innings for Ireland in ODIs also belongs to Paul Stirling, who took 6/55 against Afghanistan on 17 March 2017. Stirling is also Ireland's leading run scorer with 5,230 runs and Kevin O'Brien is the country's leading wicket-taker with 114 wickets.

Key

Players
Statistics are correct as of 23 January 2023.

Captains

In 2006 all-rounder Trent Johnston became Ireland's first ODI captain. He stepped down as captain in early 2008 and took a break from cricket as he was struggling with injury problems. William Porterfield succeeded Johnston as Ireland's full-time captain in April 2008. On occasions when Porterfield has been unavailable, sometimes due to commitments with his county side, Kyle McCallan and Kevin O'Brien have filled the role of captain.

See also
List of Irish first-class cricketers
List of Ireland Test cricketers
List of Ireland T20I cricketers

Notes

References

External links
Searchable database of International Cricketers (filtered by country) (Howstat)
List of Ireland ODI Caps and debuts (Cricinfo)

Ireland ODI
ODI